George Mosson (2 February 1851 – 3 September 1933) was a Franco-German painter and draftsman, founding member of the artists' association Berliner Secession. He was mainly known for his paintings of still lives representing flowers, but he also painted landscapes and portraits.

Career 

Mosson was born in 1851 in Aix-en-Provence, in the south of France. He emigrated to Berlin at the age of 14, where he finished his schooling. His artistic training began with studies at the Academy of Arts, Berlin, with professors Carl Steffeck and Hermann Freese. He continued his studies at the Weimar Saxon Grand Ducal Art School, and began to exhibit his works in Berlin in 1884.

In 1892, Mosson was co-founder of the  collective as well as founding member of the Berliner Secession association, grouped together to protest against the conservatism of the "Association of Berlin Artists". After the split of this group in 1913, Mosson joined forces with Max Liebermann, Max Slevogt and others to form the Free Secession. He was also a member of the Union of German Artists ("Deutschen Künstlerbundes").

Mosson died on September 3, 1933, in Berlin.

Paintings

References

Bibliography

External links 

 George Mosson, Artnet.
 George Mosson, Mutualart.

1851 births
1933 deaths
Artists from Aix-en-Provence
19th-century German painters
20th-century German painters
German male painters
19th-century French painters
20th-century French painters
20th-century German male artists
French male painters
French draughtsmen
German draughtsmen
19th-century French male artists